Bernardino Ciceri (born 1650) was an Italian painter of the Baroque period, active mainly in Pavia. He was a pupil of the painter Carlo Sacchi in Rome. One of his pupils was Gioseffo Cristona. He painted the Baptism of Christ for the church of Santa Maria del Carmine, Pavia.

References

1650 births
17th-century Italian painters
Italian male painters
Italian Baroque painters
Year of death missing